Shangmei Town was a historic town and the former seat of Xinhua County in Hunan, China. The town was reformed through the amalgamation of Liaoyuan Township, Beidu Township, Fenglin Township and Chengguan Town in 1995.

The town was located in the south east of the county, it was bordered by the towns of Caojia and Youjia to the north, by Sangzi Town to the east, by the town of Shichongkou to the south, by Ketou Township and Luguan Town to the west. The town had 29 villages and 23 communities under its jurisdiction in 2017, its seat was at Yingbin Road. It ceased to be a separate town on November 6, 2017, the town and Shangdu Office were divided into three subdistricts of Shangmei, Shangdu and Fenglin.

Administrative division
In 2017, the town of Shangmei had 29 villages and 23 communities under its jurisdiction.

23 communities
 Beita Community
 Chongyangling Community
 Dongwai Community
 Fujingshan Community
 Gongnong Community
 Gongnonghe Community
 Huaxin Community
 Huochezhan Community
 Liaoyuan Community
 Lixinqiao Community
 Ma'anshan Community
 Meishu Community
 Paomaling Community
 Pingshanlong Community
 Qingshijie Community
 Shangtian Community
 Shizijie Community
 Wuliting Community
 Xintian Community
 Yongxing Community
 Yuanzhuling Community
 Yuxugong Community
 Xinyuan Community merging from Caojia in 2017

29 villages
 Beidu Village
 Dashuiping Village
 Fengshuxincun Village
 Hexing Village
 Hongda Village
 Hongqixincun Village
 Hongxing Village
 Huanglong Village
 Huashan Village
 Jielong Village
 Jizhong Village
 Maojialong Village
 Wanjiaqiao Village
 Xiatian Village
 Xindu Village
 Xingyue Village
 Xintang Village
 Huayuan Village merging from Youjia in 2017
 Jiangxi Village merging from Ketou in 2017
 Jinzishan Village merging from Youjia in 2017
 Niangjia Village merging from Caojia in 2017
 Qingyun Village merging from Caojia in 2017
 Qinjian Village merging from Caojia in 2017
 Qinsan Village merging from Caojia in 2017
 Tianzhu Village merging from Caojia in 2017
 Tishang Village merging from Youjia in 2017
 Xiangrong Village  merging from Sangzi in 2017
 Xingling Village merging from Youjia in 2017
 Zhimushan Village merging from Caojia in 2017

References

Divisions of Xinhua County
County seats in Hunan